Eratosthenes crater is a relatively deep lunar impact crater that lies on the boundary between the Mare Imbrium and Sinus Aestuum mare regions. It forms the western terminus of the Montes Apenninus mountain range. It is named after ancient Greek astronomer Eratosthenes of Cyrene, who estimated the circumference of the Earth, and the distance from the Earth to the Sun.

Description
The crater has a well-defined circular rim, terraced inner wall, central mountain peaks, an irregular floor, and an outer rampart of ejecta. It lacks a ray system of its own, but is overlain by rays from the prominent crater Copernicus to the south-west.

The Eratosthenian period in the lunar geological timescale is named after this crater, though it does not define the start of this time period. The crater is believed to have been formed about 3.2 billion years ago.

At low Sun-angles, this crater is prominent due to the shadow cast by the rim. When the Sun is directly overhead, however, Eratosthenes visually blends into the surroundings, and it becomes more difficult for an observer to locate it. The rays from Copernicus lie across this area, and their higher albedo serves as a form of camouflage.

In 1851 Shropshire Astronomer Henry Blunt constructed a model of the moon's surface showing Eratosthenes. The model is based on observations made by Blunt with a reflecting telescope from his home in Shrewsbury and was displayed in the same year at the Great Exhibition, London.

In 1910–1920th, William H. Pickering noted dark patches in the crater that varied in a regular manner over each lunar day. He put forward the speculative idea that these patches appeared to migrate across the surface, suggestive of herds of small life forms. The idea received a degree of attention primarily due to Pickering's reputation.

Satellite craters
By convention these features are identified on lunar maps by placing the letter on the side of the crater midpoint that is closest to Eratosthenes.

References

Further reading

External links
 
Eratosthenes at The Moon Wiki
 Lunar Orbiter 5 photos of Eratosthenes:  frame 133, frame 134, frame 135, frame 136
 PDF newsletter - The Lunar Observer: Feature of the Month - MARCH 2006: FOCUS ON: Eratosthenes
 LAC 58, a map of the region including Eratosthenes and Copernicus
 LROC pages:
Eratosthenes Crater and the Lunar Timescale
Terraces in Eratosthenes Crater
Eratosthenes Central Peak

, a repeat of October 31, 1996 APOD (of Hallowe'en)
 
  - featuring three released photos from Luna 19 from 1971 - it includes Eratosthenes in the third one
 
 
 
 
 
 
 
 

Impact craters on the Moon